André Krust (10 May 1926 - 7 September 2020) was a French classical pianist.

Biography 
Born in Belfort, Krust studied at the Conservatoire de Paris in Jean Doyen's class and won a second prize for piano in 1950. He later worked with Yves Nat and Pierre Kostanoff, and won a prize at the International Franz Liszt Piano Competition in 1956. He has been teaching at the Amiens and Montreuil conservatories, at the Université d'Ottawa and the Conservatoire de Luxembourg. He died in Aulnay-sous-Bois on 7 September 2020.

Discography 
Schumann's complete works for piano at RCA, 1973.

Sources 
Charles Timbrell, French pianism: an historical perspective, Kahn & Averill, London, 1999, .

External links 
 Discography (Discogs)
 Schumann - André Krust (1973) Kinderszenen Op. 15 (YouTube)
 Match ID

Musicians from Belfort
1926 births
2020 deaths
20th-century French male classical pianists
Conservatoire de Paris alumni
Piano pedagogues